Joseph Gibbs was a portrait painter who worked in the area around Smethwick, then South Staffordshire (now part of the West Midlands county), England, during the period 1852 to 1907.

He exhibited at some Royal Birmingham Society of Artists events.

Six of his works (five portraits and a pastoral scene showing two children crossing a river) are in the collection of Wednesbury Museum and Art Gallery:

 Mary Ann Richards (painted 1891)
 Muriel Dorothy Windle (1898)
 Sir James Timmins Chance (1902)
 Alderman George Bowden, Mayor of Smethwick (1904)
 Stepping Stones (The Nearest Way Home) (1907)
 Frederick Talbot, Headmaster of Chance's School, Smethwick

References

External links 
 

English portrait painters
19th-century births
20th-century deaths
Year of birth unknown
Year of death unknown
People from Smethwick